Officine Générale is a French men's and women's clothing brand founded by Pierre Mahéo. 
The brand is based in Saint-Germain-des-Prés, Paris and uses French, British and Italian fabrics. Mahéo has stated: “Officine Générale isn’t in the fashion industry. It isn’t fashion. Our point of view is different: beautiful normality.”

Its flagship store is located at  6 Rue du Dragon, just off of Boulevard Saint-Germain.

See also
rag & bone
Billy Reid

References

External links
The 10 Coolest French Brands Out Now Jian DeLeon,  Complex.

Clothing brands of France
Clothing retailers of France
2000s fashion